James William Nantz III (born May 17, 1959) is an American sportscaster who has worked on telecasts of the National Football League (NFL),  NCAA Division I men's basketball, the NBA and the PGA Tour for CBS Sports since the 1980s. He has anchored CBS's coverage of the Masters Tournament since 1989 and been the lead play-by-play announcer on CBS's NFL coverage since 2004.

Early life and education
Born in Charlotte, North Carolina, Nantz grew up in New Orleans, Louisiana, Colts Neck Township, New Jersey, and Marlboro Township, New Jersey, where he attended Marlboro High School. In high school, he was co-captain of the basketball team and co-captain and number one player on the golf team. He was a member of Bamm Hollow Country Club.

Nantz then matriculated at the University of Houston where he played on the Cougars men's golf team, rooming with future professional golfers Fred Couples and Blaine McCallister. He graduated with a Bachelor of Arts in Radio and Television Broadcasting in 1981. It was during this time that Nantz got his first experience in sports broadcasting with the CBS Radio Network, transmitting taped interviews to Win Elliot for the latter's Sports Central USA weekend reports.

Broadcasting career

Before CBS Sports
Nantz started as an anchor and sportscaster for KHOU in Houston, Texas in the early 1980s and then became a weekend sports anchor on KSL-TV in Salt Lake City (1982–1985) where he called BYU football games and Utah Jazz games along with Hot Rod Hundley.

At CBS Sports
Nantz joined CBS Sports in 1985, initially working as a studio host for the network's college football and basketball coverage, and as an on-course reporter for PGA Tour golf, as well as calling NFL games on Westwood One (from 1988 to 1990, when he was moved to television, Nantz called Sunday Night Football games for what was then called CBS Radio Sports). Nantz has anchored CBS' coverage of the Masters Tournament since 1989. He teamed with Billy Packer to call the NCAA Final Four men's basketball finals from 1991 until 2008. From 2008 to 2013, Clark Kellogg had been his analyst. From 2010 to 2013, Nantz and Kellogg were joined during the Final Four by Steve Kerr of Turner Sports. From 2013 to 2014, Greg Anthony partnered with Nantz. Following Anthony's suspension, Bill Raftery and Grant Hill were selected to replace him and are Nantz's new partners.  Since 2002, Nantz has opened each broadcast by saying, "Hello, friends".

The NFL on CBS
After hosting CBS's pre-game program The NFL Today from 1998 to 2003, he became The NFL on CBS top play-by-play announcer in 2004. That move sent Greg Gumbel to the studio, and Nantz to the stadium booth with Phil Simms. In 1991 and 1992, Nantz, like Tim Brant, was paired with analyst Hank Stram on NFL broadcasts. In 1993, he had previously filled-in for his predecessor, Greg Gumbel as NFL Today host while Gumbel was away covering the American League Championship Series for CBS. Verne Lundquist and Dan Fouts were the #2 team for much of the 1993 season. However, Nantz and Randy Cross would call the second round playoff game for CBS (Dallas vs. Green Bay) not called by Pat Summerall and John Madden. Meanwhile, Tim Ryan and Matt Millen were the #3 team for much of the 1993 season.

On February 4, 2007, Nantz called the play-by-play of Super Bowl XLI. He joins Curt Gowdy, Kevin Harlan, and Dick Enberg as the only play-by-play announcers to ever call both a Super Bowl and an NCAA Men's Basketball Championship Game. (Greg Gumbel called CBS's previous Super Bowls, Super Bowl XXXV and Super Bowl XXXVIII.) Nantz is also one of two men to host a Super Bowl, announce an NCAA Men's Basketball Championship game, and host coverage of The Masters from Butler Cabin with Brent Musburger being the other. Musburger also accomplished all three feats with CBS. During Super Bowl XLVII, Joe Flacco unknowingly hit Nantz with the Vince Lombardi Trophy during the presentation, but Nantz simply brushed it off.

In 2014, Nantz and broadcast partner Phil Simms called Thursday Night Football games in a deal with CBS and the NFL Network. Tracy Wolfson was the sideline reporter for the Thursday games along with the Sunday games on CBS. In 2017, former Dallas Cowboys quarterback Tony Romo replaced Phil Simms as Nantz's color commentator for CBS' NFL telecasts.

Nantz and Romo called Super Bowl LIII in 2019 and Super Bowl LV in 2021. On January 9, 2022, Tom McCarthy filled in for Nantz for a Week 18 game featuring the Carolina Panthers and Tampa Bay Buccaneers. Nantz, like Romo the year before, had to sit out of the final week of the regular season due to COVID protocols.

Media appearances
Nantz has appeared on episodes of The Price Is Right to present a Showcase prize that involves CBS Sports properties, one to attend the 2009 Final Four in Detroit and another in 2010 for Super Bowl XLIV (with Phil Simms), as part of changes to the long-time game show to use product placement models and CBS crossovers, including sports packages. Nantz appeared as himself in the 1996 film Tin Cup and has appeared in episodes of several television series including Arliss, Yes, Dear, Criminal Minds, and How I Met Your Mother (season 5, episode 14 + 15 and season 9, episode 24). He portrayed the announcer for the fictional baseball team in the short-lived series Clubhouse, and his voice can be heard in the 1998 film Scrapple.

Since 2009, Nantz has guest commentated on the final round of The Open Championship for the BBC.

Nantz teamed with Gary McCord to provide extensive commentary in the 1999 PC golf game Jack Nicklaus 6: Golden Bear Challenge, and his commentary is featured in the Golden Tee Golf arcade game series. From 2012 until 2016 (when they were replaced with Brandon Gaudin and Charles Davis), Nantz, along with Phil Simms, provided commentary for the Madden NFL series. In 2013, Nantz appeared in a Papa John's Pizza ad with Peyton Manning, quarterback of the Denver Broncos, and founder John Schnatter. He has also been part of Capital One's March Madness ad campaign featuring Charles Barkley, Samuel L. Jackson, and Spike Lee.

Career timeline
 1985–1988; 1997: NCAA Football on CBS – studio host
 1986–present: PGA Tour on CBS (since 1994 as host)
 1986–1990: College Basketball on CBS – studio host
 1986–1989: NBA on CBS – lead play-by-play
 1987–1990: NFL on CBS Radio – play-by-play
 1987–1995: US Open (tennis) – play-by-play
 1989–present: The Masters host
 1989–1991; 1996–1997: NCAA Football on CBS – lead play-by-play
 1990–2023: College Basketball on CBS/Turner – lead play-by-play
 1988–1993; 2004–present: NFL on CBS – play-by-play (1993 as #2; 2004–present as lead)
 1992 and 1994: Winter Olympics – weekend daytime co-host
 1994–1995; 2000–2001: Macy's Thanksgiving Day Parade host (under the title "The Thanksgiving Day Parade on CBS") 
 1998–2003: The NFL Today host
 1998: Olympic Winter Games – primetime host
 2014–2017: Thursday Night Football – lead play-by-play

Awards and honors
Three-time Sports Emmy Award winner for Outstanding Sports Personality, Play-by-Play (2008 and 2009).
Five-time NSMA National Sportscaster of the Year (1998, 2005, 2007, 2008, 2009). 
2002 Curt Gowdy Award from the Basketball Hall of Fame.
2011 Pete Rozelle Radio-Television Award from the Pro Football Hall of Fame. 
2021 GCSAA Old Tom Morris Award from the Golf Course Superintendents Association of America
NSMA Hall of Fame inductee (class of 2021)

Personal life
Nantz's first book, Always By My Side – A Father's Grace and a Sports Journey Unlike Any Other, was released in May 2008. Nantz tells personal stories from football, basketball, and golf, and how he has met people along the way who remind him of the virtues his father instilled in him. The foreword to the book was written by one of his father figures, friend and frequent golf partner, former President George H. W. Bush. Nantz's father, Jim Nantz Jr., died in 2008 after being diagnosed with Alzheimer's disease; he was treated at The Methodist Hospital in Houston, Texas. In January 2011, Nantz and The Methodist Hospital in Houston, Texas, launched the Nantz National Alzheimer Center. The mission of the Center is to improve care and treatment for patients with Alzheimer's disease through the advancement of research and the investigation of its causes, including the role of concussions and other past neurological trauma.

Nantz was married to Ann-Lorraine "Lorrie" Carlsen Nantz for 26 years before divorcing in 2009. The couple lived in Westport, Connecticut, and had one child, daughter Caroline. In November 2009, Nantz was ordered to pay his ex-wife $916,000 a year in child support and alimony. Nantz acknowledged dating a 29-year-old woman before the divorce was final, although the judge concluded the marriage deteriorated years earlier and "this remote event in no way contributed to the breakdown of the marriage." Nantz was said to earn $7 million in 2009.

On June 9, 2012, Nantz married Courtney Richards in a ceremony at the Pebble Beach Golf Links in Pebble Beach, California, specifically at the tee of the course's famed seventh hole. Nantz and his wife have a daughter born in 2014 and a son born in 2016.

Nantz and his family used to live in a home overlooking the Pebble Beach Links that he bought in October 2011. The home's most notable feature is a 50%-scale replica of the seventh hole at Pebble Beach, located in the backyard. The backyard hole is a popular spot for visiting golfers, sports luminaries, and other celebrities. Visitors who make a hole-in-one have their names inscribed on a rock that stands next to the tee box. Nantz and his family currently reside in Nashville, Tennessee.

Winemaking

In 2009, Nantz partnered with wine producer Peter Deutsch to launch a private wine label The Calling with its first vintage released in 2012. The wine's name is in reference to Nantz's calling of the Masters Tournament.

See also
List of celebrities who own wineries and vineyards

References

External links

 CBS Sports Team – CBS SportsLine.com 
 Jim Nantz named 2005 "National Sportscaster of the Year"

1959 births
Living people
American television sports announcers
BYU Cougars football announcers
College basketball announcers in the United States
College football announcers
Golf writers and broadcasters
Gymnastics broadcasters
Houston Cougars men's golfers
Olympic Games broadcasters
Marlboro High School alumni
National Football League announcers
People from Colts Neck Township, New Jersey
People from Marlboro Township, New Jersey
Pete Rozelle Radio-Television Award recipients
Sports Emmy Award winners
Sportspeople from Charlotte, North Carolina
Sportspeople from New Orleans
Tennis commentators
Track and field broadcasters
Utah Jazz announcers
Writers from Charlotte, North Carolina